Pani Tri Oktavianti (born 12 January 2002) is an Indonesian footballer who plays as a defender for Asprov Jabar and the Indonesia women's national team.

Club career
Pani has played for Persib Bandung and Asprov Jabar.

International career 
Pani represented Indonesia at the 2022 AFC Women's Asian Cup.

Honours

Club
Persib Bandung
 Liga 1 Putri: 2019

References

External links

2002 births
Living people
Sportspeople from Jakarta
Indonesian women's footballers
Women's association football defenders
Indonesia women's international footballers